Bremen I is an electoral constituency (German: Wahlkreis) represented in the Bundestag. It elects one member via first-past-the-post voting. Under the current constituency numbering system, it is designated as constituency 54. It is located in the state of Bremen, comprising eastern and southern parts of the city of Bremen.

Bremen I was created for the inaugural 1949 federal election. Since 2017, it has been represented by Sarah Ryglewski of the Social Democratic Party (SPD).

Geography
Bremen I is located in the state of Bremen. As of the 2021 federal election, it comprises the borough of Ost, the Stadtteil of Mitte from the borough of Mitte, and the Stadtteile of Neustadt, Obervieland, and Huchting from the borough of Süd.

History
Bremen I was created in 1949, then known as Bremen-Ost. It acquired its current name in the 2002 election. In the inaugural Bundestag election, it was Bremen constituency 1 in the numbering system. From 1953 through 1961, it was number 57. From 1965 through 1998, it was number 50. In the 2002 and 2005 elections, it was number 54. In the 2009 election, it was number 55. Since the 2013 election, it has been number 54.

Originally, the constituency comprised the borough of Ost and the Ortsteile of Huckelriede, Habenhausen, and Arsten. In the 1965 through 1994 elections, it comprised the borough of Ost, the Stadtteil of Obervieland, and the Ortsteile of Huckelriede and Ostertor. In the 1998 election, it lost the Ortsteile of Huckelriede and Ostertor. The constituency acquired its current borders in the 2002 election.

Members
The constituency has been held continuously by the Social Democratic Party (SPD) since its creation. Its first representative was Heinz Meyer, who served from 1949 to 1953. Hermann Hansing served from 1953 to 1972. He was succeeded by Ernst Waltemathe, who served until 1994. Volker Kröning who elected in 1994 and served until 2009. In 2009, future mayor of Bremen Carsten Sieling was elected representative. He was re-elected in 2013. Sarah Ryglewski was elected in the 2017 election.

Election results

2021 election

2017 election

2013 election

2009 election

References

Federal electoral districts in Bremen (state)
Bremerhaven
Politics of Bremen (city)
1949 establishments in West Germany
Constituencies established in 1949